Lucas Pires may refer to:
 Francisco Lucas Pires, Portuguese teacher, lawyer, and politician
 Lucas Pires (footballer), Brazilian footballer